Great Bosullow (meaning dwelling of the house of light) is a hamlet south-east of Morvah in west Cornwall, England, UK. Bosullow Common is an extensive area of heathland. Great Bosullow lies within the Cornwall Area of Outstanding Natural Beauty (AONB). Almost a third of Cornwall has AONB designation, with the same status and protection as a National Park.

The freehold of Great Bosullow was put up for auction on 24 April 1883. The property consisted of a house, barn, stable, cattle-house, piggeries and other outbuildings. The commons including a portion of Choone Castle, where there was good quantities of good building stone.

See also

 List of farms in Cornwall

References

External links
 

Farms in Cornwall
Penwith